The Bangladesh National Film Award for Best Music Composition is the highest award for music composition in Bangladeshi film.

History
Azad Rahman became the first recipient in this category for Jadur Banshi (1977). But the category wasn't continued the next two decades. In 1997, it was given to Khan Ataur Rahman. From 2000 onward it has been given regularly alongside the Bangladesh National Film Award for Best Music Direction.

Records
Emon Saha is the most awarded music composer with three wins.
 Alauddin Ali, Alam Khan, Emon Saha, and Satya Saha are the only composers who have won National Awards in both the composer and music director categories.

List of winners
Key

See also
 Bangladesh National Film Award for Best Music Director
 Bangladesh National Film Award for Best Lyrics
 Bangladesh National Film Award for Best Male Playback Singer
 Bangladesh National Film Award for Best Female Playback Singer

Notes

References

Sources

 
 
 
 
 
 

Music Composer
Film music awards